Lieutenant-General Sir Henry Pottinger, 1st Baronet  (3 October 1789 – 18 March 1856) was an Anglo-Irish soldier and colonial administrator who became the first Governor of Hong Kong.

Early life 
Henry Pottinger was born at his family estate of Mount Pottinger in Ballymacarrett, County Down, Ireland, on 3 October 1789. He descended from the Pottingers of Berkshire, an old English family with a branch that settled in Ireland in the 17th century. He was the fifth son of Eldred Curwen Pottinger and his wife Anne. They had three daughters and eight sons. His nephew was also named Eldred Pottinger. Henry attended the Belfast Academy until the age of 12. In 1803, he left for India to join the East India Company's maritime service, but in the following year joined the Company's military service as a cadet instead. He studied local languages in Bombay and became an assistant teacher. On 18 September 1806, he was made an ensign and promoted to lieutenant on 16 July 1809.

India 

Pottinger explored the lands between the Indus and Persia, travelling in disguise as a Muslim merchant and studying local languages, under the orders of Sir John Malcolm. In 1809, he served as a lieutenant in the Third Anglo-Maratha War. In 1810, he and Charles Christie undertook an expedition from Nushki (Balochistan) to Isfahan (Central Persia) disguised as Muslims. Christie went north to Herat and then west while Pottinger went west across two deserts to Kerman and Isfahan where they rejoined. The expedition was funded by the East India Company to map and research the regions of Balochistan and Persia because of concerns about India being invaded by French forces. It would be 100 years before another European took this route, and Pottinger rose to the rank of Colonel. Pottinger later became Resident Administrator of Sindh in 1820. He later held the same post in Hyderabad.

He was made a baronet when he returned to England in 1839.

China 

Pottinger accepted Foreign Secretary Lord Palmerston's offer of the post of envoy and plenipotentiary in China and superintendent of British trade, thus replacing Charles Elliot. In 1841, Palmerston instructed him to "examine with care the natural capacities of Hong Kong, and you will not agree to give up that Island unless you should find that you can exchange it for another in the neighbourhood of Canton, better adapted for the purposes in view; equally defensible; and affording sufficient shelter for Ships of War and Commerce".

Pottinger left London on 5 June, travelled by ship through the Mediterranean, over land across the Suez, and reached Bombay on 7 July, where he stayed for 10 days before arriving in China on 10 August. The whole trip took 67 days, a record at the time. On 4 November, Palmerston's successor Lord Aberdeen wrote to Pottinger that he had doubts over Hong Kong's acquisition since it would incur administrative expenses, and complicate relations with China and other nations.

After Pottinger joined the British expeditionary force in northern China, he negotiated the terms of the Treaty of Nanking (1842), which ended the First Opium War and ceded Hong Kong Island to the United Kingdom. Pottinger wrote in a letter to Aberdeen that at a feast celebrating the ratification with his Hong Kong counterpart, Keying, Keying insisted they ceremonially exchange miniature portraits of each member of each others' families. Upon receiving a miniature portrait of Pottinger's wife, Pottinger wrote that Keying "placed it on his head—which I am told is the highest token of respect and friendship—filled a glass of wine, held the picture in front of his face, muttered some words in a low voice, drank the wine, again placed the picture on his head and then sat down" to complete the ceremony of long-term amity between the two families and the two peoples.

Governor of Hong Kong 

Pottinger became the second Administrator of Hong Kong (1841–1843) and the first Governor of Hong Kong (1843–1844). When he forwarded the treaty to Aberdeen, Pottinger remarked, "the retention of Hong Kong is the only point in which I have intentionally exceeded my modified instructions, but every single hour I have passed in this superb country has convinced me of the necessity and desirability of our possessing such a settlement as an emporium for our trade and a place from which Her Majesty's subjects in China may be alike protected and controlled."

On 26 April 1843, Pottinger's residence, now the Former French Mission Building, was burgled. In May 1843, he recommended a police force of four officers and 50 men be recruited from Britain, but this was rejected on financial grounds.

On 26 June 1843, he was appointed to become the Chief Commander of the British troops stationed in Hong Kong.

During his short tenure, Pottinger established executive and legislative chambers, with one discussing political affairs and one designing legal codes. However, the chambers did not convene often, and this gave Pottinger wide-ranging powers to decide on policy.

Towards the end of his tenure, Pottinger lost the support of the local British merchants and was isolated. He left on 7 May 1844.

During his governorship, Hong Kong became the major port for trading opium in China.

Later life 
Pottinger returned to Britain in 1844. He became a member of the Privy Council on 23 May 1844, was presented with the freedom of many cities, and in June 1845 the House of Commons voted to grant him £1,500 a year for life. In 1847, he served as Governor of the Cape Colony. He returned to India as Governor of Madras from 1848 to 1854, and was promoted to lieutenant-general in 1851. He died in retirement in Malta on 18 March 1856. He was buried in the Protestant cemetery, now known as the Msida Bastion Historic Garden, in Floriana. A marble plaque is still visible.

Family 
In 1820, Pottinger married Susanna Maria Cooke (1800–1886), daughter of Captain Richard Cooke. They had three sons and a daughter:
Eldred Elphinstone Pottinger (born 1822); died in infancy.
Frederick Pottinger, 2nd Baronet (1831–1865); police inspector.
Henry Pottinger, 3rd Baronet (1834–1909); barrister; married in 1863; one daughter who married Henry Meysey-Thompson, 1st Baron Knaresborough.
Henrietta Maria Pottinger (died 1905); married in 1850; three sons and a daughter.

Namesakes 
Pottinger Street, Central, Hong Kong
Pottinger Peak, Hong Kong
Pottinger Gap, Hong Kong
Pottinger Battery, Devil's Peak, Hong Kong
Pottingers Entry, Belfast, Northern Ireland
Pottinger House, Belfast Royal Academy, Northern Ireland
Belfast Pottinger, UK Parliament constituency
Pottinger County, New South Wales, Australia

Honours
  1839 Baronetcy (Bt)
  2 December 1842 Knight Grand Cross of the Order of the Bath Civil Division (GCB)
  23 May 1844 Member of Her Majesty's Most Honourable Privy Council (PC)

Freedom of the City
  13 February 1845: London
  Glasgow
  Edinburgh

Works 
Travels in Beloochistan and Sinde. London: Longman. 1816.

References

External links
 
 

Members of the Privy Council of the United Kingdom
1789 births
1856 deaths
19th-century Anglo-Irish people
Baronets in the Baronetage of the United Kingdom
British East India Company Army officers
British military personnel of the Third Anglo-Maratha War
British people of the First Opium War
Governors of Hong Kong
Governors of the Cape Colony
People educated at the Belfast Royal Academy
Military personnel from Belfast
Great Game
19th-century British politicians
British spies